Stevan H. Lieberman (born July 22, 1965 in Brooklyn, New York City) is an American lawyer, regarded as a legal expert in intellectual property law and patent law. He is a partner of the Washington, D.C.-based law firm, Greenberg & Lieberman, with Michael Greenberg, established in 1996. As part of the firm, Lieberman has been involved in hundreds of UDRP or trademark infringement disputes, and he is considered a pioneer in the technology-law areas of virtual worlds, domain names and software, cited by CNN as "among the virtual world's earning elite." Among the first lawyers in the world to begin generating a significant revenue and client base via online virtual worlds such as Second Life; he is the co-founder and CEO of two virtual reality websites.

Early life and background
Lieberman was born in Brooklyn, New York City. He attended Adelphi University in Garden City, Long Island, where he graduated in 1987 with a BA with Honors. He later earned a certificate with the Stroussbourg Institute of Human Rights in 1993 and earned his juris doctor from the David A. Clarke School of Law (District of Columbia School of Law) in May 1994. Lieberman is a member of the American Bar Association, American Intellectual Property Law Association, Montgomery County Bar Association, Montgomery County High Tech Committee, and Alpha Epsilon Phi Fraternity.

Lieberman formed Washington, D.C.-based law firm, Greenberg & Lieberman, with Michael Greenberg in 1996. A national and an international firm, the company has a particular focus on computer Internet law and patent prosecution for small businesses. As of 2010, the firm has served over 20,000 clients.
In the burgeoning area of domain name law and litigation, Lieberman is recognized as one of the top three legal experts in the world. Lieberman is regarded as being on the forefront of litigation relating to reverse domain hijacking as well as domain names and trademarks in dispute. Through his law firm, Lieberman has testified to Congress  while also listing as a colleague John B. Anderson, who was a 10-term Congressman in the U.S. House of Representatives.

Career
As part of Greenberg & Lieberman, Lieberman and Greenberg have filed almost 300 trademarks and over 560 patent files as of September 2011. One of his earliest cases was a successful motion to dismiss copyright infringement suit based on lack of personal jurisdiction in Evan K. Aidman v. Mark S. Nelson in 1999. In September 1999 he was involved in a motion to dismiss patent infringement matter in Molnlycke Health Care AB v. Dumex Medical Surgical, a notable case in Internet law. In 2000 he was involved in a trademark infringement matter in the National Jewish Defense League (JDL) v. Mordechai Levy case which ended in November 2002 when JDL chairman Irv Rubin died in suspicious circumstances in jail, and defended against copyright infringement in the Studio Martis, B.V. v. Joseph D. Wager Smith case. In 2001 he was involved in a trademark matter concerning Apache Boats v. Mark McManus and made a motion to dismiss in the Ramfan Corporation v. Super Vacuum Manufacturing case. In 2002, Lieberman's involvement in the
Ramsey v. Schutt, et al. in the Maryland State Circuit Court for Charles County was influential in changing the rule in Maryland pertaining to what is necessary in a contract to obviate liability.

In 2003, Lieberman was involved in several UDRP or trademark infringement disputes, and the following year, the firm continued to represent Future Media Architects and Internet Development Corporation in a series of disputes over UDRP and trademark infringements and other matters.

In 2005, Lieberman was involved in the federal court and mediation in the Ariadne Genomics v. Stratagene California dispute. He was hired by Mastercard International Incorporated v. Priceless.com to settle a trademark matter. The firm also represented clients in several UDRP cases such as  EuroChannel, Inc. v. Mrs. Jello and RCS Recover Services v. John Laxton RL.COM, a case which is still ongoing as of September 2011. In 2006, Lieberman represented H2Ocean against Schmitt, April's After-Care and April's Attic in a case which was settled and was involved in UDRP disputes such as Equifax, inc v. The Tidewinds Group, Inc., Marchex v. Name Development Corp. and Thomas Weisel Partners Group, Inc. v. Tom Weisel House of Entertainment.

In 2007, Greenberg & Lieberman were hired by businessman Antonis Polemitis in a case against Ville de Paris, a Municipal Corporation of the city of Paris at the Virginia Eastern District Court involving the Lanham Act in which the client claimed tortious interference with contract and defamation. They also represented some major global firms in trademark matters such as Nike, Inc. v. Niyad Enterprise in California Central District Court, Microsoft v. Domain Source, Inc. and UDRP cases involving firms such as HSBC Finance Corp. and Payday America, Inc..

In 2008, Lieberman was involved in a trademark/domain matter between Air China and Airchina.com and with LG Electronics USA and LG.com. He was also hired in a Second Life case between Chris Mead and Jakob Hyvarinen and in the UDRP cases of Blue Magic, Inc. v. Johns Creak Software Inc. and Genzyme Corporation v. Abadaba S.A. In 2009 he was again hired by Abadaba in a trademark matter against Microsoft and by the Broward Rehab Center Inc. against Rafael Foss. Lieberman also represented dentist Alex McMillan IV v. Tom Winkler case in a dispute over cybersquatting. The Alexandria Circuit Court ruled in favor of their client McMillan in a case which involved "a legal action initiated against a former employee charged with trademark infringement, trade secret violations, and domain theft." Lieberman has said, "2009 was most definitely an interesting year. We saw a large number of corporations, Verizon, Microsoft & Costco to just mention a few, taking the scorched earth point of view and suing everyone they can, even individuals and entities that no longer owned the alleged infringing domain names. This of course led to a large number of confidential settlements, which it can be assumed, were all rather painful to those paying to end the law suits."

In 2010, Lieberman was involved in copyright cases in the John M. Smith vs Gosmile, Inc. dispute (settled), and began representing the Second Life firm Amaretto Ranch Breedables, LLC v. Ozimals, Inc. in a copyright infringement case in California Northern District Court, overlooked by judge Charles R. Breyer. As of October 2011, the Amaretto case is still ongoing. He was also active in the Warren Weitzman v. Lead Networks trademark case and was hired by The ERGO Baby, Inc. v. Amaya Lucy in a UDRP case. In 2011, Greenberg & Lieberman were again hired by ERGO to represent them in another UDRP case against Henghao Zhan Jianzong and by Value Eyecare Network, Inc. in a dispute against Chengbiao Zhan. In April 2011, Lieberman lost a case representing Rabbi Shmuel Herzfeld of the Modern Orthodox Ohev Sholom - The National Synagogue in northwest Washington when U.S. District Court Judge Emmet G. Sullivan denied the request of the rabbi to have an upcoming local election rescheduled because it conflicted with the Jewish Passover.

Virtual World contribution
Lieberman is credited for being among the first lawyers in the world to begin generating a significant revenue and client base via online virtual worlds such as Second Life. For example, through the Washington, DC-based law firm of Greenberg & Lieberman, CNN has cited him as "among the virtual world's earning elite." In 2007 CNN reported that the American Bar Association and the Federal Bureau of Investigation (FBI) are among the organizations seeking assistance and legal guidance from Lieberman on issues relating to business practices in virtual worlds. He is a regular lecturer for the Montgomery County Bar Association on intellectual property issues. He has said, "IP law is extraordinarily complicated and a 3-D image helps people to reach out and touch items so that they can understand my explanations. Second Life makes people feel as if they have physically met one another. In addition, its interactive capabilities help users, particularly lawyers, to clarify difficult concepts. Second Life is not another world; it is an extension of real life." Lieberman assumes the name of "Navets Potato" (Navets is Stevan spelled backwards) in Second Life and has multiple avatars, one which resembles himself and some six others as of 2007, based on what he wants to accomplish.

References

External links
 Greenberg & Lieberman

American lawyers
Adelphi University alumni
1965 births
Living people
David A. Clarke School of Law alumni
People from Brooklyn